The following lists events that happened in 2015 in Turkey.

Incumbents
President: Recep Tayyip Erdoğan

Prime Minister: Ahmet Davutoğlu

Events

January
 January 6 – A suicide bomber kills two people in an attack on a police station in a popular tourist district in Istanbul.

April
 April 24, 25 – The 100th anniversary of the Gallipoli campaign was commemorated in Çanakkale and Istanbul.

June
 June 7 – 24th General election was held to elect the 550 new members of Grand National Assembly of Turkey.

July
 July 20 – 2015 Suruç bombing

October
 October 10 – 2015 Ankara bombings

November
 November 15, 16 – The tenth G20 summit was held in Antalya.

Deaths

January 
 January 4 - Neşe Aybey, miniaturist (b. 1930)

February 
 February 8 - Müzeyyen Senar, classical music performer (b. 1918)
 February 14 - Beria Onger, feminist activist and writer (b. 1921)
 February 16 - Fikret Şeneş, songwriter (b. 1921)
 February 18 - Asuman Baytop, botanist, plant collector, pharmacologist, and educator (b. 1920)
 February 28 - Yaşar Kemal, writer and human rights activist (b. 1923)

March 
 March 16 - Nazmi Yükselen, singer, songwriter and folk music composer (b. 1926)
 March 12 - Erol Büyükburç, singer and songwriter (b. 1936)
 March 29 - Ayla Arslancan, actress (b. 1936)

April 
 April 1 - Muzaffer Tekin, military officer (b. 1950)
 April 3 - Kayahan, singer and songwriter (b. 1949)
 April 19 - Oktay Sinanoğlu, physical chemist and molecular biophysicist (b. 1935)
 April 22 - Şevket Müftügil, judge and former president of the Constitutional Court of Turkey (b. 1917)

May 
 May 8 - Zeki Alasya, actor (b. 1943)
 May 9 - Kenan Evren, politician, military officer, former Chief of the Turkish General Staff and 7th President of Turkey (b. 1917)
 May 14 - Aysel Ekşi, psychiatrist and professor (b. 1934)
 May 31 - Behiye Aksoy, singer (b. 1933)

June 
 June 5 - Sadun Boro, amateur sailor to circumnavigate the globe by sailing (b. 1928)
 June 2 - Besim Üstünel, economics, politician (b. 1927)
 June 12 - Sümer Tilmaç, actor (b. 1948)
 June 17
 Süleyman Demirel, politician, engineer, 12th Prime Minister of Turkey and 9th President of Turkey (b. 1924)
 Başar Sabuncu, director, screenwriter and cinematographer (b. 1943)
 June 29 - Osman Necmi Gürmen, novelist (b. 1927)

July 
 July 9 - Tahsin Şahinkaya, Air Force general and former Commander of the Turkish Air Force (b. 1925)

August  
 August 5 – Nuri Ok, judge (b. 1942)
 August 9 – Fikret Otyam, painter and journalist (b. 1926)
 August 19 – Fikri Alican, scientist and physician (b. 1929)

September 
 September 24 – Uğur Dağdelen, footballer (b. 1973)

October 
 October 5 – Tomris İncer, actress (b. 1948)
 October 12 – Levent Kırca, comedian, stage and film actor, columnist and politician (b. 1950)
 October 16 – Memduh Ün, film producer, director, actor and screenwrite (b. 1920)
 October 22
 Çetin Altan, writer and journalist (b. 1927)
 Yılmaz Köksal, actor (b. 1939)
 October 30 – Sinan Şamil Sam, heavyweight professional boxer (b. 1974)

November 
 November 3 – Semih Özmert, judge  (b. 1921)
 November 4 – Gülten Akın, poet (b. 1933)
 November 21 – Cavit Şadi Pehlivanoğlu, politician (b. 1927)
 November 23 – Kâmran İnan, diplomat, scholar and politician (b. 1929)

December 
 December 23
 Nimet Özgüç, archaeologist (b. 1916)
 Bülend Ulusu, admiral and 18th Prime Minister of Turkey (b. 1923) 
 December 27 – Hüseyin Başaran, sports commentator (b. 1958)

See also
2015 in Turkish television
List of Turkish films of 2015

References

 
2010s in Turkey
Years of the 21st century in Turkey
Turkey
Turkey
Turkey